This is a list of most current US baseball stadiums. They are ordered by seating capacity, the maximum number of spectators the stadium can accommodate in baseball configuration. Venues with a capacity of at least 500 are included.

See also
List of Major League Baseball stadiums
List of baseball parks by capacity
List of NCAA Division I baseball venues
List of American football stadiums by capacity
List of soccer stadiums in the United States
List of U.S. stadiums by capacity

Notes

References

Capacity
Lists of sports venues with capacity